Provincial Road 482 (PR 482) is provincial road in the far western part of the Canadian province of Manitoba.

Route description 
Provincial Road 482 is a north-south route and runs from the PTH 83 near Inglis to its terminus with PTH 5 and Hwy 10 just east of the Saskatchewan border. The northern terminus also serves as the westbound/eastbound terminuses for both PTH 5 and Hwy 10. The route provides direct access to Lake of the Prairies and Asessippi Provincial Park.

From PTH 83, PR 482 travels in an east-west direction for approximately  before meeting westbound PR 549. From PR 549, the road turns north and slightly east for  before descending into the Shell Valley and the entrance to Asessippi Provincial Park. PR 482 turns north along the Shellmouth Dam at this point.

After passing the Shellmouth Dam, PR 482 continues north and west, ascending out of the Shell Valley before passing the unincorporated community of Dropmore. The road continues west for a short distance before turning north. From this point, PR 482 travels very close to or along the Manitoba - Saskatchewan border for the rest of the route. The highway travels for another  from PR 547 before descending back into the Shell Valley near Lake of the Prairies to its northern terminus. PR 482 makes a very brief turn into Saskatchewan just south of its northern terminus.

PR 482 is a paved road for its entire length. The speed limit along this road is 90 km/h.

References

External links 
Manitoba Official Map - West Central

482